Myrciaria is a genus of large shrubs and small trees described as a genus in 1856. It is native to 
Central and South America, Mexico, and the West Indies, with many of the species endemic to Brazil.  Common names include hivapuru, sabará, and ybapuru.

The jaboticabas are a significant commercial fruit in Brazil.  The fruit is grapelike in size and appearance, and often likened to a muscadine grape in taste. Myrciaria dubia, the camu-camu berry, is grown primarily in flood-zone areas of Peru and has one of the highest vitamin C (ascorbic acid) concentrations of any fruit, alongside Terminalia ferdinandiana.

accepted species

Formerly placed here
 Plinia cauliflora (Gardner) O.Berg (as M. cauliflora (Mart.) O.Berg and *M. jaboticaba (Vell.) O.Berg)

References

 
Myrtaceae genera
Neotropical realm flora